The El Paso Museum of Archaeology presents information about the prehistory of the area surrounding El Paso, Texas. The museum is located in Wilderness Park, and is adjacent to the National Border Patrol Museum at the base of the Franklin Mountains. It is located near several archaeological sites, including rock art in the Franklin Mountains and Mogollon pueblo sites. The museum attracts about 42,000 visitors every year.

History 
The museum was opened in 1977. The site of the museum was chosen because of the number of archaeological sites in the area. Wilderness Park, where the museum is located, was established with help from the El Paso Heritage Foundation. The El Paso Archaeological Society contracted with the City of El Paso to maintaine the museum.

Exhibits and facilities 
The museum has a collection of permanent archaeological artifacts reflecting 14,000 years of prehistory in the El Paso area the greater Southwest and northern Mexico. The museum's artifacts have been appraised at a price of around $2 million. Artifacts on display include 800-year-old agave fiber cloth, various trade items, pottery and jewelry. Other items include pre-Columbian art and objects from Mexico. A series of dioramas provide an insight into ancient history of the region. The dioramas depict the cultures of the Casas Grandes and Jornada Mogollon.

The El Paso Museum of Archaeology has won grants to support various programs. In 2014, Humanities Texas awarded $1,000 for the support of speakers and exhibits.

Festivals and activities 

In the spring, the museum hosts the Annual Franklin Mountain Poppies Fest which includes flowers, activities, food and wildlife encounters.

The museum offers conferences; a signature event is the biennial Jornada Mogollon Conference which takes place on odd-numbered years.

The museum's mission statement is, "The El Paso Museum of Archaeology is dedicated to the narration, interpretation and preservation of archaeological and anthropological artifacts through research, exhibits, education, and special programs, with a focus on the prehistory and culture of the El Paso area and the Southwest". Group tours are free and available when booked in advance.

Nature 
Family activities include nature trails for exploring the flora, fauna and geology of the region. The museum has about 15 acres of natural area surrounding the building. There are over 250 varieties of native Chihuahuan Desert plants to view along a mile-long nature trail and outside the building. In addition, there are viewing areas for the Franklin Mountains, Mount Sierra Blanca and outdoor exhibits based on replicas of Apache life.

See also

List of museums in West Texas

References

External links
Official website

Museums in El Paso, Texas
Museums established in 1977
Archaeological museums in Texas
1977 establishments in Texas
Native American museums in Texas